is a private university in Shinagawa, Tokyo, Japan, specializing in pharmaceutical sciences. The predecessor of the school was founded 1922. After becoming coeducational in 1946, it was chartered as a university in 1950.

External links
 Official website

Educational institutions established in 1922
Hoshi University
Universities and colleges in Tokyo
1922 establishments in Japan